James Anthony Mills (born September 23, 1961) is a former gridiron football offensive lineman.

After graduating from Richmond Senior Secondary School in 1979, he played for the University of Hawaii before playing 2 years in the National Football League (NFL) for the Baltimore/Indianapolis Colts. While attending the University, Jim was trained in powerlifting by strength mentor Karl Holfeld. After his NFL career he headed to the Canadian Football League (CFL), where he played numerous seasons including with his hometown team the BC Lions. He won the CFL's Most Outstanding Offensive Lineman Award in 1990 and 1991. He was inducted into the Canadian Football Hall of Fame in 2009.

References 

1961 births
Living people
Canadian football people from Vancouver
Canadian players of American football
American football offensive linemen
Hawaii Rainbow Warriors football players
Baltimore Colts players
Indianapolis Colts players
Canadian football offensive linemen
Ottawa Rough Riders players
BC Lions players
Canadian Football Hall of Fame inductees
Gridiron football people from British Columbia